Kirtowal is a small village in Tehsil Malakwal, District Mandi Bahauddin Punjab, Pakistan. There are also two other villages with the same name in Indian Punjab.
This village is located around 225 Kilometer south-east of Capital city Islamabad and around 25 Kilometer away from its district headquarters Mandi Bahauddin. It has a moderate climate, which is hot in summer and cold in winter. During peak summer, the day temperature rises to 40DC, but the winter months are comparatively pleasant, with the temperature going down to 2DC only in the months of December and January. The village is located on the bank of Lower Jehlum canal.
Its population is around 2,000. People of this area are hardworking. The land is very fertile and many of the people's major source of income is farming. It covers an area of approximately 3 square kilometers. In this area, wheat, rice, and sugar cane are the major crops. The most popular game of this village is volleyball, and youngsters also enjoy playing cricket.
In this village, there are two campuses of a government model primary school; one for boys and one for girls. Many parents also like to send their children to private schools of nearby villages as these private schools relatively provide better educational environment to the students.

https://web.archive.org/web/20160204080110/http://www.mbdin.net/index.php/tehsil-malakwal/216-kirtowal-malakwal.html

Villages in Mandi Bahauddin District